HD 190647 is a yellow-hued star with an exoplanetary companion, located in the southern constellation of Sagittarius. It has an apparent visual magnitude of 7.78, making this an 8th magnitude star that is much too faint to be readily visible to the naked eye. The star is located at a distance of 178 light years from the Sun based on parallax measurements, but is drifting closer with a radial velocity of −40 km/s. It is also called HIP 99115.

The stellar classification of this star is G5V, matching a G-type main-sequence star. However, the low gravity and high luminosity of this star may indicate it is slightly evolved. It is chrompsherically inactive with a slow rotation, having a projected rotational velocity of 1.6 km/s. The star's metallicity is high, with nearly 1.5 times the abundance of iron compared to the Sun.

In 2007, a Jovian planet was found to be orbiting the star. It was detected using the radial velocity method with the HARPS spectrograph in Chile. As the inclination of the orbital plane is unknown, only a lower bound on the planetary mass can be made. It has a minimum mass 1.9 times the mass of Jupiter.

See also
 HD 100777
 HD 221287
 List of extrasolar planets

References

G-type main-sequence stars
G-type subgiants
Planetary systems with one confirmed planet
Sagittarius (constellation)
Durchmusterung objects
190647
099115